Elvis Presley: The Searcher is the soundtrack to the 2018 documentary of the same name, which garnered some 900,000 viewers for HBO when first shown on April 14, 2018. It includes 18 songs by Elvis Presley, including rare alternative versions. The album was released on April 6, 2018 by RCA Records and Legacy Recordings.

The video, also released in 2018, stayed six weeks within the top three releases, including three weeks at the top. On 28 December 2018, it earned a B.P.I. Gold Award certifying sales of 25,000 copies (streams, digital downloads and physical sales).

Track listing

Charts

References

2018 compilation albums
2018 soundtrack albums
Elvis Presley compilation albums
Legacy Recordings soundtracks
RCA Records soundtracks
Compilation albums published posthumously